Scythris alainensis is a moth of the family Scythrididae. It was described by Bengt Å. Bengtsson in 2014. It is found in Namibia and Yemen.

References

alainensis
Moths described in 2014